In prokaryote nomenclature, Candidatus (Latin for candidate of Roman office) is used to name prokaryotic phyla that are well characterized but yet-uncultured. Contemporary sequencing approaches, such as 16S ribosomal RNA sequencing or metagenomics, provide much information about the analyzed organisms and thus allow to identify and characterize individual species. However, the majority of prokaryotic species remain uncultivable and hence inaccessible for further characterization in in vitro study. The recent discoveries of a multitude of candidate taxa has led to candidate phyla radiation expanding the tree of life through the new insights in bacterial diversity.

Nomenclature

History 
The initial International Code of Nomenclature of Prokaryotes as well as early revisions did not account for the possibility of identifying prokaryotes which were not yet cultivable. Therefore, the term Candidatus was proposed in the context of a conference of the International Committee on Systematics of Prokaryotes, (ICSP, formerly International Committee on Systematic Bacteriology) in 1994 to initiate code revision.  Owing to rising numbers of Candidatus taxa associated with ongoing advances of sequencing technologies, the ICSP adopted the International Code of Nomenclature of Prokaryotes in 1996 by adding an appendix for Candidatus taxa (Appendix 11 in the most recent version). However, the nomenclature of Candidatus taxa is still not covered by the general rules of the Prokaryotic Code leading to ongoing discussions and proposals for changing the current code in order to grant priority to Candidatus taxa.

Naming 
Currently, the provisional status “Candidatus” may be used if the following information is provided:

The species name of an organism in the status of Candidatus consists of the word Candidatus, followed by an either a genus name with a specific epithet, or only a genus name, or only a specific epithet. Examples include Candidatus Liberobacter asiaticum; Candidatus magnetobacterium; Candidatus intracellularis. A list of all Candidatus taxa (a Candidatus List) is kept by the  Judicial Commission of the ICSP in cooperation with the editorial board of the IJSEM and is updated in appropriate intervals. Once a Candidatus taxa has been cultivated successfully, the name has to be removed from this list and a new name has to be proposed in accordance with the International Code of Nomenclature of Prokaryotes.

Although the 1994 proposal and the later Code call for a Candidatus List to be maintained, work on curating names did not start until 2017, when a "No. 0" trial is published. The author found that 120 of the ~400 collected names would breach the Code should they become formally proposed. Common reasons are Latin errors, duplicate names, and non-Latin names. As a result, Candidatus Lists now also offer corrections for such names. Corrected names are given corrig. (for corrigendum) in the authority field, with some sources going further to cite the correction (e.g. "Ca. Karelsulcia" corrig. Moran et al. 2005 in Ogen et al. 2020). Each published list, starting from No. 1, covers all known Candidatus names proposed in a given time period, plus any addendum for previous periods. , the latest is Candidatus List No. 4, published November 2022, covering names proposed in 2021.

Uncultivability

Environmental factors 
There are several reasons for why many prokaryotic species do not grow in the lab many of which remain poorly understood. One of these reasons is the environment the species are recovered from which can be difficult to simulate in laboratory conditions. Many prokaryotes have highly specific growth requirements including the need for a specific nutrient composition, specific pH conditions, temperatures, atmospheric pressure or levels of oxygen. Most commercially available growth media and incubation protocols poorly met these requirements making a comprehensive habitat assessment necessary in order to successfully isolate the bacteria of interest from environmental samples.

Species interaction 
Most prokaryotic species do not live alone but rather in complex communities with other species from all kingdoms of life. As a consequence, many species depend on metabolites or signaling compounds of their neighboring species for their own cell growth. The identification of the required substances can be challenging but once identified a co-cultivation or addition of the specific compound can be used to potentially cultivate the species of interest.

Genome reduction 
Many instances of species interaction are of symbiotic nature which is defined as an intimate, long-term relationship between two or more species which can be either mutualistic, neutral or harmful. Depending on the location of the symbiont, the symbionts can be either ectosymbionts or endosymbionts. Drastic genome reduction through gene deletions has been observed in endosymbiotic bacteria which is thought to be owing to the fact that many genes become unnecessary in the sheltered host environment. This frequently affects  genes for DNA repair and transcriptional regulation which makes it difficult to cultivate these organisms outside their host.

See also
 Candidate division
 Glossary of scientific naming
 International Code of Nomenclature of Bacteria
 List of taxa with candidatus status
 Undescribed taxon

References

Further reading 
 
 
 
 

Bacterial nomenclature
Candidatus taxa